The 2017–18 William & Mary Tribe men's basketball team represented the College of William & Mary during the 2017–18 NCAA Division I men's basketball season. The Tribe were coached by 15th-year head coach Tony Shaver and played their home games at Kaplan Arena in Williamsburg, Virginia as members of the Colonial Athletic Association. The Tribe finished the season 19–12, 11–7 in CAA play to finish in fourth place. They defeated Towson in the quarterfinals of the CAA tournament before losing in the semifinals to College of Charleston.

Previous season
The Tribe finished the 2016–17 season 17–14, 10–8 in CAA play to finish in a tie for fourth place. As the No. 4 seed in the CAA tournament, they defeated Elon in the quarterfinals before losing to UNC Wilmington in the semifinals.

Offseason

Departures

Incoming transfers

Recruiting class of 2017

Roster

Program notes
On December 17, Tony Shaver recorded his 200th win as head coach in a 126–69 win against Milligan, becoming the first William & Mary head men's basketball coach to achieve this milestone. This was also the Tribe's highest single-game point total in program history. The previous record (116 points) had been set in a 1995 game against George Mason.
On January 27, David Cohn recorded his 410th career assist in an 84–81 away win against UNC Wilmington, thus breaking the previous program record (409) set by David Coval between the 1982–83 and 1985–86 seasons. Cohn achieved this feat in only three seasons with the Tribe, having transferred from Colorado State after his freshman year.
On March 5, William and Mary fell in the CAA Tournament semifinals 83-73 to eventual champion Charleston, nine days after defeating them 114-104 in overtime. This marked the fourth straight year that the Tribe defeated the CAA Champion in the regular season.
The Tribe finished the season 19–12, one win away from their fourth 20-win season in the last five years. 
The Tribe finished the season with the best team three-point (43.4%) and free throw (81.0%) shooting percentages out of all teams competing in Division I . They also finished with the second-highest overall field goal percentage (51.1%) behind Saint Mary's.
Point guard David Cohn had 6.7 assists per game (best in the CAA; 11th-best in the NCAA). He also had the best free throw percentage in the CAA (.911; fifth-best in the NCAA), and was second-best in steals per game (1.6). He was the only player in the nation, out of the players on 351 Division I teams, who shot at least 50% from the field (52.9%), 40% on 3-point attempts (42.6%), and 90% in free-throw attempts (91.2%). As of November 2020, he was one of only ten NCAA players to have joined the DI men's basketball's 50-40-90 club since 1993.

Schedule and results 

|-
!colspan=9 style=| Non-conference regular season

|-
!colspan=9 style=| CAA regular season

|-
!colspan=9 style=| CAA Tournament

See also
2017–18 William & Mary Tribe women's basketball team

References

William And Mary
William & Mary Tribe men's basketball seasons
William and Mary Tribe men's basketball
William and Mary